SnapDragon Games GmbH was a German video game developer based in Hamburg. The company was founded by Christian von Duisburg in October 2005. Following the demise of CDV Software, SnapDragon Games filed for insolvency in 2010.

Notable games 
 Karate Phants: Gloves of Glory (2009)
 The Kore Gang (2010)

References 

Companies based in Hamburg
Video game development companies
Video game companies established in 2005
Video game companies disestablished in 2009
Defunct video game companies of Germany